Riley Green may refer to:

Riley Green, Lancashire, a hamlet in Lancashire, England
Riley Green (singer), American country music singer